Thomas C. Fletcher House is a historic home located at Hillsboro, Jefferson County, Missouri.  It was built about 1850, and is a two-story, log dwelling with later frame additions. It sits on a limestone and concrete block foundation.  It was the home of Thomas C. Fletcher, Missouri's first Republican governor and the first native-born Missourian elected governor.

It was listed on the National Register of Historic Places in 1974.

References 

Log houses in the United States
Houses on the National Register of Historic Places in Missouri
Houses completed in 1850
Buildings and structures in Jefferson County, Missouri
National Register of Historic Places in Jefferson County, Missouri